Gene N. Lebrun (born July 4, 1939) was an American politician in the state of South Dakota. He was a member of the South Dakota State House of Representatives. Lebrun attended the College of Saint Benedict and Saint John's University and University of North Dakota and later became a lawyer. He served as Speaker of the South Dakota House of Representatives from 1973 to 1974.

References

Living people
1939 births
Speakers of the South Dakota House of Representatives
Democratic Party members of the South Dakota House of Representatives